Lactose synthase is an enzyme that generates lactose from glucose and UDP-galactose.

It is classified under .

It consists of N-acetyllactosamine synthase and alpha-lactalbumin.  Alpha-lactalbumin, which is expressed in response to prolactin, increases the affinity of N-acetyllactosamine synthase for its substrate, causing increased production of lactose during lactation.

N-acetyllactosamine synthase falls under the category of beta-1,4-galactosyltransferase, a type-II membrane protein found in the Golgi. Alpha-lactalbumin is a Ca2+ binding protein specific to mammary glands. Beta-1,4-galactosyltransferase consists of the catalytic component and alpha-lactalbumin consists of the regulatory component of lactose synthase. Alpha-lactalbumin promotes glucose binding to beta-1,4-galactosyltransferase. The beta-1,4-galactosyltransferase catalytic component consists of two flexible loops: small loop and large loop. The small loop consists of a Trp residue (Trp314) with surrounding glycine residues, meanwhile the large loop makes up amino acid residues 345 to 365. The Trp residue in the small loop moves allowing for the sugar nucleotide to be locked into the binding site. This causes a conformational change in the large loop which then creates sites for oligosaccharide and metal ion binding, and protein-protein interactions for alpha-lactalbumin.

References

External links 
 

EC 2.4.1